Marcos Charras  (born 13 May 1983) is a retired Argentine football player.

Club performance

Last updated: 19 June 2009

Honours
South American U-20 Championship: 2003
Torneo Clausura: 2005

External links
  Player profile at Dinamo's official web-site
  Career statistics at BDFA
  Primera División Argentina statistics

1983 births
Living people
Footballers from Rosario, Santa Fe
Argentine footballers
Association football defenders
Quilmes Atlético Club footballers
PFC CSKA Sofia players
FC Dinamo Tbilisi players
Argentine expatriate sportspeople in Bulgaria
Expatriate footballers in Bulgaria
Expatriate footballers in Georgia (country)
First Professional Football League (Bulgaria) players